Edward Barton  D.D. (7 July 1768 – 11 August 1848) was an Irish Anglican priest.

Barton was born in County Fermanagh and educated at Trinity College, Dublin, He was Archdeacon of Ferns from 1798 until his death.

Notes

Alumni of Trinity College Dublin
1848 deaths
1768 births
People from County Fermanagh
19th-century Irish Anglican priests
Archdeacons of Ferns